Edward Palmer may refer to:

 Edward Palmer (d.1624) (1555–1624), antiquary and projector of a university in Virginia
 Edward Palmer (socialist) (1802–1886), American religious socialist
 Edward Palmer (Canadian politician) (1809–1889), Prince Edward Island politician
 Edward Palmer (botanist) (1829–1911), British botanist and early American archaeologist
 Edward Palmer (Australian politician) (1842–1899), squatter, public servant and conservative Queensland politician
 Edward E. Palmer, first president of the SUNY College of Environmental Science and Forestry
 Edward Henry Palmer (1840–1882), British orientalist
 Edward L. Palmer, Jr. (1877–1952), American architect
 Edward L. Palmer (1933–1999), media educator, researcher, author, and advocate
 Edward Timothy Palmer (1878–1947), Member of Parliament for Greenwich